Rolanda is a female given name which may refer to:

Rolanda Chagrin (born 1957), Israeli actress
Rolanda Bell (born 1987), Panamanian steeplechase runner
Rolanda Hooch, fictional character in Harry Potter series

See also
Roland (name)
Rolando (given name)
Rolonda Watts (born 1959), American actress

Feminine given names